Chesaning Union Schools is a public school district headquartered in Chesaning, Michigan. It is a part of the Saginaw Intermediate School District and serves the Chesaning area, including the villages of Chesaning and Oakley, Albee and Brady townships, the southern parts of Brant and St. Charles townships, eastern Chapin Township, and small parts of Maple Grove Township. Its schools include Big Rock Elementary School, Chesaning Middle School, and Chesaning High School.

References

External links

 Chesaning Union Schools

School districts in Michigan
Saginaw Intermediate School District